Dasori is a town and union council of Tando Allahyar District in the Sindh Province of Pakistan. It has a population of 49,427 and is part of Jhando Mari Taluka.

References

Union councils of Sindh
Populated places in Sindh